Jessie Winter (1886–1971) was a British stage actress, known for her roles in the West End. She also appeared in six films between 1917 and 1938. She was married to Austin Melford.

Filmography
 Mary Girl (1917)
 Goodbye (1918)
 The Twelve Pound Look (1920)
 The Diamond Necklace (1921)
 His Lordship (1936)
 Murder in the Family (1938)

Selected stage roles
 The River (1925, by Patrick Hastings)

References

Bibliography 
 Fells, Robert M. George Arliss: The Man who Played God. Scarecrow Press, 2004.
 Goble, Alan. The Complete Index to Literary Sources in Film. Walter de Gruyter, 1999.

External links 
 

1886 births
1971 deaths
People from Lambeth
British stage actresses
British film actresses